Léontine Tsiba (born 20 November 1973) is a Congolese middle-distance runner. She competed in the 800 metres at the 1996 Summer Olympics and the 2000 Summer Olympics.

References

1973 births
Living people
Athletes (track and field) at the 1996 Summer Olympics
Athletes (track and field) at the 2000 Summer Olympics
Republic of the Congo female middle-distance runners
Olympic athletes of the Republic of the Congo
Place of birth missing (living people)